Actinopus gerschiapelliarum is a species of mygalomorph spiders in the family Actinopodidae. It is found in Argentina and Uruguay.

References

gerschiapelliarum
Spiders described in 2018